Rybník is a municipality and village in Domažlice District in the Plzeň Region of the Czech Republic. It has about 200 inhabitants.

Administrative parts
The village of Závist and extinct villages of Liščí Hora and Mostek are administrative parts of Rybník.

Geography
It lies in the Upper Palatine Forest. The village is situated in the valley of the Radbuza River.

References

Villages in Domažlice District